is the term used to describe the culture of the early Edo period (1603–1867), in particular the Genroku era of 1688–1704. Genroku culture is known as a period of luxurious display when the arts were increasingly patronized by a growing and powerful merchant class.  The Genroku period is associated with two pleasure zones: the brothel district and the theaters. These two areas were often located near each other on the margins of respectable society. These constituted the  celebrated in woodblock prints of prostitutes, actors, and pornography.

Overview 

Genroku culture was mainly centered in the Kamigata area, containing both Osaka and Kyoto. Genroku culture was defined by the fashions and lives of everyday townspeople, particularly those of the merchant classes, whose rising monetary wealth led developments in decorative art, theatre and clothing; however, the samurai classes were also involved in the development of Genroku culture. Genroku culture would contribute to the development of Neo-Confucian thought, natural science, and classical study. In fine art, the Rinpa school, founded by Korin Ogata and others, and the Tosa school both played active roles; in ceramic art, Ninsei Nonomura, Hon'ami Kōetsu and others were key players.

Arts 

It is generally felt that the Genroku period marks the highest point of Edo period culture. Two representative artists of Genroku culture are Rimpa school artists Ogata Kōrin and Hishikawa Moronobu, who is regarded as the founder of ukiyo-e. The term  is an amalgamation of the last syllable of "Kōrin". Torii Kiyonobu I was another influential ukiyo-e artist active within the Genroku period.

Early manga 
The printmaking of the Genroku period would later serve as the inspiration for manga. Literary wit and knowledge was highly valued, not only in the upper echelons of society but throughout multiple castes.

The accessibility to literary arts came through a plethora of mediums. Due to the use of illustrations, this form of art appealed to the humble-ranked samurai and the common people.

Novels and poetry 
The main elements of the emerging bourgeois culture were developed during the Genroku period within the Kamigata region.

Theater

Kabuki

It is widely believed that kabuki was founded by female dancer Izumo no Okuni. Kabuki originated as a means for prostitutes, majority female, to draw crowds and entice them to purchase sexual services. Performances were often held in outdoor theaters in dry riverbeds and alongside carnival entertainments such as bear and tiger acts or sumo wrestling.

-style actor Ichikawa Danjūrō I, -style actor Sakata Tōjūrō I, and  actor Yoshizawa Ayame I are famous kabuki actors of the Genroku era.

(puppet theater) is a form of theater that emerged in the Genroku period. Featuring puppets of roughly two-thirds human size, each puppet was controlled by a maximum of three men. A highly skilled singer-actor chanted the several parts and the narration alongside musical accompanists.

The greatest  playwright was Chikamatsu Monzaemon (1653–1725). His works offered a source of escapism for the common people, including scandalous contemporary events such as domestic murders.

Noh 

Noh emerged from a host of ancient folk and popular performing arts, both indigenous and imported. During the early Edo period, Noh was frequently performed by women of the Kyoto pleasure quarters.

Noh was refined and supported by both the shogunate and imperial courts. By the height of the Edo period, Noh had climbed beyond the reaches of the Japanese masses, preserving its exalted position until the Meiji period.

See also 

 Kasei culture

References

External links 

 
 Genroku-period - britanica
 元禄文化 - Kotobank

Cultural history of Japan
Edo period